Coleophora ganglionella is a moth of the family Coleophoridae.

References

ganglionella
Moths described in 1994